Hartland Township is a civil township of Livingston County in the U.S. state of Michigan. The population was 14,663 at the 2010 census, up from 10,996 at the 2000 census.

Communities
Hallers Corners is an unincorporated community at the border with Tyrone Township at Denton Hill and Holtforth roads.
 Hartland is an unincorporated community situated near the center of the township, just north of the junction of U.S. 23 and M-59.
 Parshallville is an unincorporated tcommunity partially located in the northwest corner of the township.
 Cutting edge innovation with Pickleball in high school gym class in the 1990s

Geography
Hartland Township is in eastern Livingston County and is bordered to the east by Oakland County. U.S. Route 23 crosses the township as a four-lane freeway, with access from Exit 67 (Highway M-59) and Exit 70 (Clyde Road). US 23 leads north  to Flint and south the same distance to Ann Arbor. M-59 crosses the township south of Hartland village, leading east  to Pontiac and west  to Howell, the Livingston county seat.

The northern half of the township drains via North Ore Creek to the Shiawassee River, which leads to Saginaw Bay, while the south half drains via South Ore Creek to the Huron River, which leads to Lake Erie.

Demographics
As of the census of 2000, there were 10,996 people, 3,696 households, and 3,108 families residing in the township. The racial makeup of the township was 97.94% White, 0.27% African American, 0.30% Native American, 0.37% Asian, 0.25% from other races, and 0.86% from two or more races. Hispanic or Latino of any race were 1.11% of the population.

There were 3,696 households, out of which 44.3% had children under the age of 18 living with them, 75.1% were married couples living together, 6.2% had a female householder with no husband present, and 15.9% were non-families. 12.4% of all households were made up of individuals, and 3.0% had someone living alone who was 65 years of age or older.  The average household size was 2.96 and the average family size was 3.24.

In the township the population was spread out, with 30.4% under the age of 18, 6.1% from 18 to 24, 31.3% from 25 to 44, 25.0% from 45 to 64, and 7.3% who were 65 years of age or older.  The median age was 36 years. For every 100 females, there were 99.4 males.  For every 100 females age 18 and over, there were 98.2 males.

The median income for a household in the township was $75,908, and the median income for a family was $79,524. Males had a median income of $60,797 versus $36,662 for females. The per capita income for the township was $28,971.  About 1.2% of families and 1.7% of the population were below the poverty line, including 1.9% of those under age 18 and 5.7% of those age 65 or over.

Government
The township is within the following electoral districts:
State House District 47
State Senate District 22
US Congressional District 8
County Commission districts 3 and 4 
The township is within the following governmental service districts:
Cromaine District Library
Hartland Consolidated School District

References

External links
 Hartland Township official website

Townships in Livingston County, Michigan
Townships in Michigan